Justin Towndale is a Canadian politician who currently serves as the mayor of Cornwall, Ontario. He had previously served on the city council.

Early life 
Towndale is a Cornwall native. An Indo-Canadian, his parents, Angelo Towndale and Pushpy Angelo, migrated to Canada from Kochi in 1970. Angelo received a Meritorious Service Medal in 2016. Justin attended the University of Toronto and worked there for five years after his graduation.

Towndale is also a Captain in the Stormont, Dundas and Glengarry Highlanders, and represented the regiment in the commemorative parade in Ottawa to honour the late Queen Elizabeth II.

Political career

Cornwall City Councillor 
As councillor Towndale proposed reducing the size of the Cornwall City Council and to replace the blanket election for councillors with a ward system. Additionally he worked to lift the citywide ban on arcades and worked on the city's COVID-19 response. Additionally as councillor Towndale championed the Nav Centre as an evacuee holding center during the early stages of the pandemic. While on the council in May 2020 Fire Chief Pierre Voisine resigned and took the same job at Clarence-Rockland. In response Towndale tweeted "Just found out our Fire Chief is leaving for the same job in Clarence-Rockland. Know how I found out? Someone sent me a screenshot of the press release from Clarence-Rockland. I would have expected this sort of news from our administration, or Chief himself, first." The city council determined on March 22, 2021, that by tweeting this Towndale had violated the city's code of conduct by issuing "unwelcome" public criticisms of the city government and for "bullying" Mr. Voisine, a city employee. Towndale in return wrote a written apology and promised to never make any critical comments about the Cornwall city government on his social media again. During the end of his time as Councillor and due to his status as a Lieutenant in the SD&G Highlanders, Towndale was selected as an honorary Pallbearer at the Queen Elizabeth Memorial Parade in Ottawa coinciding with the Funeral of Queen Elizabeth II.

Mayor of Cornwall 
The key points that Towndale ran on during his mayoral election included increasing affordable housing, attracting medical professionals to the city, accessibility for the handicapped, police reforms, green initiatives and further cooperation with the Ontario provincial and Canadian federal governments. Additionally, he supported balancing the city's budget, running the city's public transit on Sundays, and supporting the creation of an arts centre despite its $4,500,000–6,500,000 price tag. On election night of October 24 he defeated incumbent interim mayor Glen Grant in the election with 5,169 votes to Grant's 4,088 with a 28.6% turnout and was sworn in as mayor on November 15. During his swearing in ceremony Towndale reaffirmed his campaign promises and that he is "eager to begin work on addressing housing issues including homelessness, to begin work on attracting more doctors and to improve internal processes like permitting."

References 

Mayors of Cornwall, Ontario
Living people
University of Toronto alumni
Stormont, Dundas and Glengarry Highlanders
1983 births